Jomalig, officially the Municipality of Jomalig,  is a 5th class municipality in the province of Quezon, Philippines. According to the 2020 census, it has a population of 7,667 people.

It is the least populated municipality in the province. It is part of the Polillo Islands.

History

Although many old Jomaligins (its people) do not know or could not remember where Jomalig derived its name, there are few old residents who still remember the legend from their ancestors. Based on the story, there was a Datu who lived in island and had a beautiful daughter. A young man from a neighboring island wanted to marry the princess but Datu didn't agree with it. The Datu said that he will only give his daughter if the young man can roam the island in just one day and successfully shoot three fishes in every pond on the island. The young man took the Datu's challenge. After he roamed the island, he almost finished the marathon, but in the end, failed to do so because he nearly died. He arrived at the finish line hopelessly and at this point, he requested the princess to kiss him as the only reward he could receive. The people in island witnessed what happened she kissed the young man and they shouted: "humalik" (They kissed). From that time on, the people on the island named the island "Humalik". Many years passed and the Humalik become Jomalig. Many old residents say that the Americans changed it when they conquered the Philippines.

Due to the geographical location of Jomalig, the district found it difficult to be recognized and established which further contributed to its slow development. It was only in the year 1952 when Jomalig, Quezon was subdivided for agricultural and residential lots sponsored by Mayor Mamerto P. Azarias and the Municipal Council.

Only through the inauguration by then Congressman Manuel S. Enverga did the civic leaders geared towards self-reliance. It instigated them towards development in agriculture and with this, many people from the Bicol Region migrated for richer pastures and an uplifted livelihood.

Jomalig Island was a former barrio of Polillo, but on January 22, 1961, with the enactment of Republic Act. No. 3372, Jomalig Island was separated from the municipal district of Polillo, Quezon.

Geography
Mostly, the land of Jomalig is cultivated for agricultural land use. Most of the inhabitants of this island depend on coconut products, rice, fish and other root crops. Some of its land have been alienated and is dedicated mostly on coconut land which is at 3,104.0 hectares with 2,605 hectares which comprises forests, swamps and grassland.

The inhabitants of this municipality originates from different ethnic groups similar to those of from Eastern Samar, Bohol, Sorsogon, Catanduanes, Camarines Sur and Camarines Norte and mostly from Quezon Province.

Barangays
Jomalig is politically subdivided into 5 barangays.
Bukal
Casuguran
Gango
Talisoy (Poblacion)
Apad

Climate

Demographics

Economy

See also
 List of islands of the Philippines

References

External links

Jomalig Profile at PhilAtlas.com
{ Philippine Standard Geographic Code]
Philippine Census Information
Local Governance Performance Management System

Municipalities of Quezon
Islands of Quezon
Island municipalities in the Philippines